Carenum batesi is a species of ground beetle in the subfamily Scaritinae. It was described by Masters in 1885.

References

batesi
Beetles described in 1885